Crematogaster amabilis is a species of ant in tribe Crematogastrini. It was described by Santschi in 1911.

References

amabilis
Insects described in 1911
Taxa named by Felix Santschi